Eastern Province is a province of Sri Lanka, containing the Ampara District, Batticaloa District, and Trincomalee District. The following is a list of settlements in the province.



A
Addalaichenai
Akkaraipattu
Ampara
Ampilanthurai
Arayampathy

B
Batticaloa

C
Central camp
chenkalady

D
Divulapothana

E
Eruvil
Eravur

K
Kalmunai
Karaitivu
Kanchikudicharu
Kokkaddicholai
Kaluwanchikudy
Kathiraveli
Kattankudy
Kantale

L
Lahugala

M
Mandur
Maruthamunai

N
Navithanveli
Nintavur

O
Oluvil
Oddamavadi

P
Pottuvil
Pandiruppu
Paddipalai
Pasikudah

R
Ranamadu

S
Sammanthurai 
Sainthamaruthu
Santhiveli
Sangaman Kanda
Saththurukondan

T
Taigahahinna
Thalankudah
Thalavai
Thamaraikerni
Thamaravillu
Thambiluvil
Thamaraikulam
Thampaddai
Tampalakamam
Thampalawattai
Thandiyadi
Thannamunai
Tannipalai
Tembichchiya
Thennamaravadi
Tettativu
Thalayadimadu
Thaddumunai
Thiaveddavan
Thikkodai
Thikkoddaimunmari
Thimilatheevu
Thiraymadu
Thirukkovil
Thirukkaikuda
Thuraineelavanai
Thukkuvittan
Thumpalancholai
Trincomalee

U
Uhana
Udumpankulam
Unnichchai
Uppodai
Uppukkachchimadu
Uppuveli
Urani(Batticaloa)
Urachery 
Uriyankaddu 
Urukamam 
Uthuchchenai

V
Vaddavan
Vettilaipoddamadu
Vaddipoddamadu
Vaikaladichchenai
Vakaneri
Vakantonai 
Vakarai 
Valaichchenai
Valaiyiravu 
Valaitoddam 
Vammivattavan 
Vammiyadiyuttu
Vantharumoolai
Vannameddutidal 
Vannatital 
Vathakkalmadu 
Vattalaikodichchenai 
Vavunatheevu 
Vayiriuttu
Vedakudiyiruppu 
Vedativu 
Veddukkadduveli 
Veechukalmunai
Veeradiya 
Veeramunai 
Vellaimanal 
Vellaiyadimadu
Vellamachchenai 
Vellaveli
Veppadithurai 
Veppankuda 
Veranativu
Verukal
Vettimakkalkudiyiruppu 
Vinayagapuram, Sri Lanka
Vilavedduvan
Viliraiyadippuval
Verugal Malai

See also
 List of cities in Sri Lanka
 List of towns in Sri Lanka

External links
 Cities and Towns in North Eastern Province, Sri Lanka

 
Eastern Province
Eastern Province